Stephen Moyer (born Stephen John Emery; 11 October 1969) is an English film and television actor who is best known as vampire Bill Compton in the HBO series True Blood. His first television role was in 1993 as Philip Masefield in the TV adaptation of the play Conjugal Rites, written by actor/playwright Roger Hall.

This was followed by the television film Lord of Misrule, filmed in Fowey, Cornwall, which also featured Richard Wilson, Emily Mortimer and Prunella Scales. In 1997, Moyer made his big-screen debut landing the lead role in the film adaptation of the long-running comic strip Prince Valiant by Hal Foster, working alongside Ron Perlman and Katherine Heigl. From 2017 to 2019, he starred as Reed Strucker, the lead role in Fox series The Gifted.

Early life and career

Moyer was born in Brentwood, Essex and attended St Martin's, a comprehensive school in Hutton, Essex. He graduated from the London Academy of Music and Dramatic Art (LAMDA). He became Brentwood Theatre's first patron in October 2007, especially supporting their "Reaching Out, Building On" campaign to help fund the 2008 completion of backstage facilities. After graduating from LAMDA, Moyer worked in theatre for five years. He worked with the National Theatre Wales, the Royal Shakespeare Company and the Oxford Stage Company, work which included going on tour and playing Romeo in productions of Romeo and Juliet. He then made the transition to television and film.

On 2 October 2017, Moyer debuted in the lead role of Reed Strucker, a district attorney whose duties include the apprehension of "mutants" with extraordinary powers, in the Fox series The Gifted, loosely based on The X-Men feature film series. The devoted family man does not realise, however, just how much his work life and family life are about to intersect. Fox ordered a 10-episode first season.

Personal life
Moyer has a son named Billy, born in 2000, from his first marriage. He also has a daughter, Lilac, from his seven-year relationship with journalist Lorien Haynes.

In August 2009, Moyer became engaged to actress Anna Paquin, who played his character's love interest, Sookie Stackhouse, in the HBO series True Blood. They had been dating since filming the series pilot in 2007. The couple married on 21 August 2010 at a private residence in Malibu, California. Moyer and Paquin have a son, Charlie, and a daughter, Poppy, who are fraternal twins. The family resides in Venice, Los Angeles.

Moyer has dealt with alcoholism in the past. In 2015, he said that he had been sober for 14 years and that the addiction stemmed from his roots in British theatre, emulating the public images of personal heroes like Peter O’Toole. At a CLARE Foundation dinner he stated, “There's this rush that happens from doing our job, this whirring buzz, and you want to continue that buzz." He now works with CLARE Foundation (a southern California non-profit facility) to help others with rehabilitation and sobriety.

Moyer is a supporter of West Ham United F.C.

Filmography

Film

Television

Awards

References

External links

 
 Fansite
 Official website (archived)

1969 births
Alumni of the London Academy of Music and Dramatic Art
English male film actors
English male stage actors
English male television actors
English expatriates in the United States
British expatriate male actors in the United States
Living people
People from Brentwood, Essex
English television directors
20th-century English male actors
21st-century English male actors
Male actors from Essex